Bas Eickhout (born 8 October 1976) is a Dutch politician who has been a Member of the European Parliament (MEP) since the 2009 elections. He is a member of the GreenLeft, part of the European Green Party.

Education and early career 
Eickhout attended high school at the Cobbenhagen College in Tilburg. Between 1994 and 2000, he studied chemistry and environmental science at Radboud University in Nijmegen. During his studies, he was an intern at research information centers in Nijmegen and in the United States. He also chaired the Nijmegen Association of Chemistry Students Sigma, and he was a member of the Nijmegen University Council.

From 2000, Eickhout worked as a researcher at the Netherlands National Institute for Public Health and the Environment. He worked on several projects which had to do with transnational environmental problems such as climate change, and was the institute's spokesperson on the sustainability of biofuels.

Political career 

Since the 1990s, Eickhout has been active in the GreenLeft; he co-authored the 2006 election manifesto, and he was a candidate in the 2004 European Parliament election (#6, the party got only two seats). Between 2008 and 2009, he was a member of the committee chaired by Bram van Ojik which wrote the new party platform. He is a member of the GreenLeft delegation to the European Green Party.

Before the 2009 European Parliament election, Eickhout was one of five candidates for the top position on the GreenLeft list. Other contenders were Senator Tineke Strik, Amsterdam city counselor Judith Sargentini, former MEP Alexander de Roo, and Niels van den Berge, assistant to Kathalijne Buitenweg. Eickhout campaigned on environmental issues. With 25% of the votes, he lost to Judith Sargentini. His candidacy for the party list was supported by former MPs Arie van den Brand and Wijnand Duyvendak. On the party congress, he was placed second on the GreenLeft list for the European Parliament.

After his election to the European Parliament, Eickhout became a member of the Committee on the Environment, Public Health and Food Safety, and substitute for the Committee on Agriculture and Rural Development. In this capacity, he represented the Parliament at the 2013 United Nations Climate Change Conference in Warsaw, the 2014 United Nations Climate Change Conference in Lima, and the 2021 United Nations Climate Change Conference in Glasgow. He has also served as the Parliament's rapporteur on the EU's target for reducing greenhouse-gas emissions (2011), the European Union Emission Trading Scheme (2014), renewable energy rules (2017) and sustainable finance (2019). He is also a member of the European Parliament Intergroup on the Welfare and Conservation of Animals.

On 24 November 2018, Eickhout was elected as one of two leading candidates of the European Greens for the 2019 European Parliament elections, alongside Ska Keller. Under his leadership, GreenLeft won three seats, up from two in 2014. Both Keller and Eickhout later became the Green candidates for the office of President of the European Commission. He has since been serving as deputy chairman of the Greens–European Free Alliance (Greens/EFA) group, under the leadership of co-chairs Keller and Philippe Lamberts.

Since 2021, Eickout has been part of the Parliament's delegation to the EU-UK Parliamentary Assembly, which provides parliamentary oversight over the implementation of the EU–UK Trade and Cooperation Agreement.

Recognition
In December 2020, Eickhout received the Environment award at The Parliament Magazine's annual MEP Awards.

References

External links

Bas Eickhout

profile on europarl.eu

1976 births
Living people
GroenLinks MEPs
GroenLinks politicians
MEPs for the Netherlands 2009–2014
People from Groesbeek
MEPs for the Netherlands 2014–2019
Articles containing video clips
MEPs for the Netherlands 2019–2024